Traina may refer to:

 Troina, Sicilian name of a former bishopric and present Latin Catholic titular see
 Traina (moth), a moth genus in the family Geometridae
 Traina Center for the Arts, formerly the Downing Street School, in the US state of Massachusetts
 Traina (surname), including a list of people with the name